Charles A. Wanamaker (born 1949) is the Professor of Christian Studies at the University of Cape Town. He specializes in New Testament and Early Christianity studies, with a special interest in the application of socio-rhetorical analysis to the study of the writings of Paul. Wanamaker was educated at the University of Durham. Currently working on a socio-rhetorical commentary on 1 Corinthians.

His doctoral thesis earned at Durham University in 1980 was entitled "The Son and the Sons of God : a study in the elements of Paul's christological and soteriological thought".

Wanamaker is married to Helena.

Current Research
He has a Socio-Rhetorical Commentary on 1 Corinthians in preparation to be published by Deo Press and Westminster/John Knox Press. Also, he is preparing a translation of 3 Maccabees for The Lexham Greek-English Interlinear Septuagint.

Selected works

Books

Articles

References

Living people
Bible commentators
Academic staff of the University of Cape Town
Alumni of Durham University Graduate Society
1949 births